The Shops at Chestnut Hill is a two-level enclosed shopping mall, located in the Chestnut Hill section of Newton, Massachusetts on Boylston Street (Route 9). 
As of 2022, the mall currently features two Bloomingdales, as well as prominent brands Apple, Uniqlo, Crate & Barrel, Tiffany & Co., and Brooks Brothers.

It is managed by Simon Property Group, who owns 94.4% of it. Bloomingdale's Women's store is located at the west end of the complex and the Men's Home & Furnishing store anchoring the east end. These are the only Bloomingdale's locations in Massachusetts.

History

The Shops at Chestnut Hill, formerly known as The Mall at Chestnut Hill, was built into the side of a hill in 1974 and as such had ground level access on both of its two floors. A  Bloomingdale's Home Furnishings store had opened at the site in 1973, while the two-story  mall itself and a  Filene's store opened in 1974. The Filene's had relocated from a neighboring 1950s-era location in the Chestnut Hill Shopping Center (which became the headquarters of General Cinema in 1975, later becoming the location of The Container Store and an AMC Theatres, which closed in 2012).

In 1998 locally based S.R. Weiner & Associates assumed a long-term lease on the mall property from developer C&R Realty. In December 2001 S.R. Weiner in its turn assigned management as well as sold part of its leasehold in the mall to Rodamco North America, N.V. A few months later, with the break-up of Rodamco, Simon Property Group acquired management and an interest in the mall's leasehold.

The mall's structure and anchors remained essentially intact from 1980 until 2005, when May Department Stores (the then parent of Filene's) was acquired by Federated Department Stores (the owner of Bloomingdale's). In March 2006, Federated closed the Filene's store and spent the better part of the year renovating the space. In November 2006 Bloomingdale's relocated its Women's store from the adjacent Chestnut Hill Shopping Center to the former Filene's, thereby giving The Mall at Chestnut Hill a Bloomingdale's at both the east and west ends.

The mall was renovated in the fall of 2006 to coincide with the opening of the expanded Bloomingdale's. In addition to adding more chairs and sitting areas, a large handicapped-accessible elevator was installed in the central atrium close to the main, Route 9, entrance.

The Apple Store location moved from its original location into a much larger one, re-opening on March 26, 2016, sporting the newest Apple store design language.

The first Massachusetts location of Frank Pepe Pizzeria Napoletana opened in December 2015 on the second level at the main entrance, at the location of the former Papa Razzi. A Simon-operated Starbucks opened Summer 2016 nearby, at the same entrance.

References

External links
 

Buildings and structures in Newton, Massachusetts
Chestnut Hill, Massachusetts
Shopping malls established in 1974
Shopping malls in Massachusetts
Tourist attractions in Middlesex County, Massachusetts
1974 establishments in Massachusetts